A special election was held in  on September 8, 1823 to fill a vacancy created by the resignation of William Eustis (DR) prior to the start of the 18th Congress.

Election results

Bailey was subsequently declared not eligible for his seat, vacating his seat on March 18, 1824.  Another special election was held  which re-elected Bailey.

See also
List of special elections to the United States House of Representatives

References

Massachusetts 1823 10
Massachusetts 1823 10
1823 10
Massachusetts 10
United States House of Representatives 10
September 1823 events
United States House of Representatives 1823 10